Davit Kizilashvili (born 20 January 1971 in Zemo Alvani) is a retired Georgian professional football player.

International goals

1971 births
Living people
Soviet footballers
Footballers from Georgia (country)
Expatriate footballers from Georgia (country)
Expatriate footballers in Cyprus
Expatriate footballers in Israel
Georgia (country) international footballers
FC Dinamo Tbilisi players
AC Omonia players
Hapoel Ashkelon F.C. players
Cypriot First Division players
Association football forwards